The Solomon Islands National University (SINU) was established in 2013 by the Government of the Solomon Islands to provide quality and affordable education.

Faculties 

SINU has five faculties and a centre for distance and flexible learning. The faculties are listed below:

 Faculty of Business & Tourism Studies 
  Faculty of Science & Technology 
  Faculty of Nursing, Medicine & Health Science 
  Faculty of Agriculture, Fisheries & Forestry 
  Faculty of Education & Humanities

Leadership

Dr Ganesh Chand is the Vice Chancellor of SINU. He is the former Vice Chancellor of Fiji National University.

References

Universities and colleges in the Solomon Islands